Zawada (from the Polish noun zawada, meaning "hindrance, encumbrance, obstacle, stumbling block", or similar) may refer to:

People
Zawada (surname)

Places
Zawada, Lower Silesian Voivodeship (south-west Poland)
Zawada, Bydgoszcz County in Kuyavian-Pomeranian Voivodeship (north-central Poland)
Zawada, Gmina Pruszcz in Kuyavian-Pomeranian Voivodeship (north-central Poland)
Zawada, Lubartów County in Lublin Voivodeship (east Poland)
Zawada, Łęczyca County in Łódź Voivodeship (central Poland)
Zawada, Poddębice County in Łódź Voivodeship (central Poland)
Zawada, Tomaszów Mazowiecki County in Łódź Voivodeship (central Poland)
Zawada, Bochnia County in Lesser Poland Voivodeship (south Poland)
Zawada, Puławy County in Lublin Voivodeship (east Poland)
Zawada, Myślenice County in Lesser Poland Voivodeship (south Poland)
Zawada, Olkusz County in Lesser Poland Voivodeship (south Poland)
Zawada, Zamość County in Lublin Voivodeship (east Poland)
Zawada, Tarnów County in Lesser Poland Voivodeship (south Poland)
Zawada, Busko County in Świętokrzyskie Voivodeship (south-central Poland)
Zawada, Subcarpathian Voivodeship (south-east Poland)
Zawada, Kielce County in Świętokrzyskie Voivodeship (south-central Poland)
Zawada, Opatów County in Świętokrzyskie Voivodeship (south-central Poland)
Zawada, Staszów County in Świętokrzyskie Voivodeship (south-central Poland)
Zawada, Masovian Voivodeship (east-central Poland)
Zawada, Gostyń County in Greater Poland Voivodeship (west-central Poland)
Zawada, Nowy Tomyśl County in Greater Poland Voivodeship (west-central Poland)
Zawada, Gmina Łobżenica in Greater Poland Voivodeship (west-central Poland)
Zawada, Gmina Szydłowo in Greater Poland Voivodeship (west-central Poland)
Zawada, Będzin County in Silesian Voivodeship (south Poland)
Zawada, Gmina Kamienica Polska in Silesian Voivodeship (south Poland)
Zawada, Gmina Kłomnice in Silesian Voivodeship (south Poland)
Zawada, Gmina Mstów in Silesian Voivodeship (south Poland)
Zawada, Myszków County in Silesian Voivodeship (south Poland)
Zawada, Tarnowskie Góry County in Silesian Voivodeship (south Poland)
Zawada, Krosno Odrzańskie County in Lubusz Voivodeship (west Poland)
Zawada, Nowa Sól County in Lubusz Voivodeship (west Poland)
Zawada, Zielona Góra County in Lubusz Voivodeship (west Poland)
Zawada, Opole County in Opole Voivodeship (south-west Poland)
Zawada, Prudnik County in Opole Voivodeship (south-west Poland)
Zawada, Chojnice County in Pomeranian Voivodeship (north Poland)
Zawada, Człuchów County in Pomeranian Voivodeship (north Poland)
Zawada, Słupsk County in Pomeranian Voivodeship (north Poland)
Zawada, Starogard County in Pomeranian Voivodeship (north Poland)
Zawada, Mrągowo County in Warmian-Masurian Voivodeship (north Poland)
Zawada, Nowe Miasto County in Warmian-Masurian Voivodeship (north Poland)
Zawada, Olsztyn County in Warmian-Masurian Voivodeship (north Poland)

See also
 
Zawada Książęca
Zawada Lanckorońska
Zawada Nowa
Zawada Pilicka
Zawada Stara
Zawada Uszewska
Kolonia Zawada
Nowa Zawada
Zawady (disambiguation)
Zawadka (disambiguation)
Zawadki (disambiguation)
Zawadzki, a toponymic surname derived from one of the listed place names

cs:Závada (rozcestník)
sk:Závada